WVF may refer to:

Wivelsfield railway station, a railway station in Sussex, England
World Veterans Federation, the world's largest international veteran organisation